Jeffrey Hugh Schwartz (born March 6, 1948) is an American physical anthropologist and professor of biological anthropology at the University of Pittsburgh in Pittsburgh, Pennsylvania, and a fellow and President of the World Academy of Art and Science (WAAS) from 2008-2012.

Schwartz' research involves the methods, theories, and philosophies in evolutionary biology, including the origins and diversification of primates.  He has studied and analyzed human and primate skeletons and archaeological remains, focusing much of his research on dentofacial morphology.  He has done substantial fieldwork and museum research in the collections of major museums around the globe.

Work, research, and recognitions
In the revised and updated publication of The Red Ape: Orangutans and Human Origins, he presents additional evidence for his contention that orangutans share significantly more morphological similarities to humans than does any other great ape.

He has also been a major contributor to the George Washington project, an attempt to create wax figure likenesses of the first U.S. President at the ages of 19, 45, and 57, based upon dentofacial morphology. On public display in a new education center and museum at Mount Vernon, the models also went on a 9-city national tour to promote the museum.

Since 1998 he has served as a consultant in forensic anthropology to the Allegheny County coroner's office.

In 2007 he was elected President of the World Academy of Art and Science for a five-year term (one year as president-elect).  He was the first person so elected, all previous presidents having been directly appointed by trustees of the organization.

Education
Born March 6, 1948 in Richmond, Virginia, Schwartz earned his bachelor's degree from Columbia College in 1969 and completed his doctorate from Columbia University in 1974.

Family
Schwartz is the son of Jack Schwartz, a doctor who did quinine research during World War II,  and Lillian Schwartz, one of the earliest visual artists to utilize computer imaging. He is married to the poet Lynn Emanuel and they reside in Pittsburgh.

Major works

Film
Jeffrey H. Schwartz made an appearance in the documentary film The Trouble with Atheism.

See also 
Birutė Galdikas

References

External links

1948 births
American anthropologists
Living people
American paleoanthropologists
Scientists from Pittsburgh
University of Pittsburgh faculty